Vinko Marinović (born 3 March 1971) is a Bosnian professional football manager and former player who is the manager of Bosnian Premier League club Borac Banja Luka.

Club career
Marinović started playing football at nine years of age with the youth teams of Kozara Gradiška. In 1988, he was included in the senior team that competed in those days, still in SFR Yugoslavia in lower tier leagues. His good exhibitions called the attention of the biggest regional club Borac Banja Luka.

With the beginning of the Bosnian War in 1992, Marinović's club was moved to Serbia, and continued, under the same name, to play in the First League of FR Yugoslavia, composed of clubs from Serbia, Montenegro and Borac Banja Luka from Bosnia and Herzegovina. In many statistical football websites, his club, since in those years was playing in the territory of Serbia, is confused with another Serbian top league club, with the same name, Borac, but from another town, Čačak.

In 1995, he moved alongside his teammate Darko Ljubojević to 1991 European and World champions Red Star Belgrade. Marinović soon started playing in the initial squad, and his solid exhibitions and strong character made him the team captain in the next years. After four seasons, he and the club made the decision that was time for him to move abroad, so in the summer of 1999, Marinović signed with Belgian First Division A club Beerschot from Antwerp, where his initial success was stopped by a terrible injury.

After four, not so happy seasons there, Marinović decided to return to Bosnia where he signed with Bosnian Premier League club Laktaši, where he did get his physical condition back, assuming the lead as the captain of the team and playing an impressive 108 league games in four seasons, having scored his best 17 goals. In 2008, Marinović decided to return to his youth years club Kozara Gradiška where he finished his playing career.

International career
Marinović decided to represent the FR Yugoslavia national team (Serbia and Montenegro), for which he played one match. It was on 23 December 1998 in a friendly match in Tel Aviv against, the home side, Israel. He entered as a substitute for Slobodan Komljenović late in the match.

Managerial career

Early career
After retiring, Marinović graduated in the Managerial Academy in Belgrade and became the manager of his previous club Kozara, with whom he succeeded the promotion to the Bosnian Premier League after winning the 2010–11 First League of RS season.

After getting sacked at Kozara, he was for a short period the manager of Serbian First League club Kolubara in 2012, but a year later became an assistant manager at Borac Banja Luka. Afterwards, he was the manager of Borac from 2014 to 2015.

Zrinjski Mostar
After a fairly good season as Borac manager, Marinović became the new manager of Zrinjski Mostar. In his second season with Zrinjski, he won the league title one round before the end of the season and after the finish of the season he was named Bosnian Premier League Manager of the Season.

In December 2016, during the league's winter break, Marinović left Zrinjski. At the time Zrinjski were first on the league table.

Bosnia and Herzegovina U21
In March 2017, Marinović was named the new head coach of the Bosnia and Herzegovina U21 national team. After the ending of the 2019 UEFA Euro U21 qualification in 2018, Marinović made one of the best results in the qualification finishing third in the group. Four points less than second placed Portugal and six less than first placed Romania.

On 26 December 2018, he signed a new contract which was due to last until October 2022. However, on 26 December 2019, Marinović left the national team to become the new manager of Sarajevo. He officially left the team a day later, on 27 December, terminating his contract with the Bosnia and Herzegovina FA.

Sarajevo

2019–20 season
On 26 December 2019, Marinović came back to club management after three years and became the new manager of Sarajevo. He was officially announced as the new Sarajevo manager four days later, on 30 December, signing a two and a half year contract. In his first game as Sarajevo manager, Marinović's team beat Tula City 6–2 in a league match on 22 February 2020.

On 1 June 2020, the 2019–20 Bosnian Premier League season ended abruptly due to the COVID-19 pandemic in Bosnia and Herzegovina and by default, Sarajevo, led by Marinović, were crowned league champions for a second consecutive time. This also marked a historic moment for the league as Marinović became the first manager to win the Bosnian Premier League since its formation in 2000 with two different clubs, the first one being Zrinjski and their 2015–16 title win, and the second one being Sarajevo.

2020–21 season
Marinović suffered his first loss as Sarajevo manager on 26 August 2020, in a 2020–21 UEFA Champions League second qualifying round match against Dynamo Brest. Ultimately, he would qualify the club to the 2020–21 UEFA Europa League play-off round, where they would get eliminated by Scottish club Celtic and miss out on a chance to play in the group stage.

Marinović made a new Bosnian Premier League record with the club on 30 October 2020, after a league game against Mladost Doboj Kakanj, in which Sarajevo ended the game unbeaten and continued their 12-game unbeaten run in the league since the beginning of the season, surpassing the one of fierce city rivals Željezničar, which was an 11 league game unbeaten run since the start of the 2019–20 Bosnian Premier League season. 

In his first ever Sarajevo derby, Marinović's side drew against Željezničar at home in a league match on 4 November 2020, but still continuing their 13-game unbeaten run in the league. He made a new record with Sarajevo by not losing any competitive domestic game in the year 2020, winning 19 and drawing only 6 of their 25 games that year.

Marinović oversaw his first competitive domestic game loss as Sarajevo manager in a league match against his former club Zrinjski Mostar, played on 6 March 2021. His first Sarajevo derby win as Sarajevo manager came on 1 May 2021 against Željezničar.

On 12 May 2021, a day after Sarajevo's disappointing home draw against Sloboda Tuzla, Marinović and the club agreed to terminate his contract by mutual agreement due to poor results in the last few games and after losing first place in the 2020–21 season to Marinović's former club Borac Banja Luka.

Return to Borac Banja Luka
On 28 August 2022, Borac Banja Luka appointed Marinović as manager for the second time, replacing Nenad Lalatović who resigned two days prior.

His first competitive game back in charge of Borac ended in a 1–0 home win against Zrinjski Mostar on 31 August. On 4 September 2022, Marinović suffered his first defeat as Borac manager in a 2–0 loss to Široki Brijeg. On 18 February 2023, Borac was knocked out by Rudar Prijedor in the second round of the Bosnian Cup following a penalty shoot-out, with Marinović taking the blame for the elimination.

Personal life
Marinović was born in Vienna, Austria, but was brought up in Gradiška. During the Bosnian War, he played for Borac Banja Luka, until his move to Red Star Belgrade.

He was in Belgrade during the NATO bombing of Yugoslavia, after which he moved to Belgium, where he stayed until 2003, returning to Bosnia and Herzegovina. He is married to Klaudija Marinović, with whom he has two daughters.

Managerial statistics

Honours

Player
Borac Banja Luka
Mitropa Cup: 1992
Republika Srpska Cup: 1994–95

Red Star Belgrade
First League of FR Yugoslavia: 1994–95
FR Yugoslav Cup: 1994–95, 1995–96, 1996–97

Laktaši
First League of RS: 2006–07

Manager
Kozara Gradiška
First League of RS: 2010–11

Zrinjski Mostar
Bosnian Premier League: 2015–16

Sarajevo
Bosnian Premier League: 2019–20

Individual
Bosnian Premier League Manager of the Season: 2015–16

See also
List of Red Star Belgrade footballers

References

External links

1971 births
Living people
Footballers from Vienna
Serbs of Bosnia and Herzegovina
Association football defenders
Yugoslav footballers
Bosnia and Herzegovina footballers
Serbia and Montenegro footballers
Serbia and Montenegro international footballers
FK Kozara Gradiška players
FK Borac Banja Luka players
Red Star Belgrade footballers
Beerschot A.C. players
FK Laktaši players
Yugoslav First League players
First League of Serbia and Montenegro players
Belgian Pro League players
Premier League of Bosnia and Herzegovina players
Bosnia and Herzegovina expatriate footballers
Serbia and Montenegro expatriate footballers
Expatriate footballers in Belgium
Bosnia and Herzegovina expatriate sportspeople in Belgium
Serbia and Montenegro expatriate sportspeople in Belgium
Bosnia and Herzegovina football managers
FK Kozara Gradiška managers
FK Kolubara managers
FK Borac Banja Luka managers 
HŠK Zrinjski managers
Bosnia and Herzegovina national under-21 football team managers
FK Sarajevo managers
Premier League of Bosnia and Herzegovina managers
Bosnia and Herzegovina expatriate football managers
Expatriate football managers in Serbia
Bosnia and Herzegovina expatriate sportspeople in Serbia